Class 165 may refer to:

British Rail Class 165
Kaidai-type submarine, also known as I-165 class